Todd Murphy (born 15 November 2000) is an Australian cricketer. A right-arm off break bowler raised in the Southern NSW town of Moama, he made his List A debut on 10 March 2021, for Victoria in the 2020–21 Marsh One-Day Cup. Prior to his List A debut, Murphy was named in Australia's squad for the 2020 Under-19 Cricket World Cup. He made his first-class debut on 3 April 2021, for Victoria in the 2020–21 Sheffield Shield season. He made his Twenty20 debut on 26 December 2021, for the Sydney Sixers in the 2021–22 Big Bash League season.

Murphy was born in Echuca, Victoria, and raised just across the Murray River in Moama, New South Wales.

In 2022, Murphy was studying for a Bachelor of Exercise and Sport Science/Bachelor of Business (Sport Management) at Deakin University. In 2023, Murphy was named as a member of the Australian test squad for the team's tour of India. Murphy was one of four spinners selected alongside Nathan Lyon, Ashton Agar, and Mitchell Swepson.

In February 2023, Murphy took 7 wickets on his Test debut in Australia's first test of their Indian tour.

References

External links
 

2000 births
Living people
Australian cricketers
Victoria cricketers
Place of birth missing (living people)
Sydney Sixers cricketers
Australia Test cricketers
Cricketers who have taken five wickets on Test debut